The 2002–03 CBA season is the eighth CBA season.

The season ran from December 7, 2002 to April 23, 2003. Beijing Olympians and Xinjiang Flying Tigers were promoted from the Second Division.  Hong Kong club Flying Dragons joined CBA in this season.

Regular Season Standings

Playoffs 

The top 8 teams in the regular season advanced to the playoffs.

In the Final series, Bayi Rockets defeated Guangdong Southern Tigers (3-1).

Teams in bold advanced to the next round. The numbers to the left of each team indicate the team's seeding in regular season, and the numbers to the right indicate the number of games the team won in that round. Home court advantage belongs to the team with the better regular season record; teams enjoying the home advantage are shown in italics.

Relegations
2 teams played the relegation round by a best-of-five series.

Sina Lions, with Hong Kong Flying Dragons, was relegated to the Second Division. As a matter of fact, Hong Kong Flying Dragons dissolved after this season, while Sina Lions dropped out of the league and went back to Taiwan.

References

See also
Chinese Basketball Association

 
Chinese Basketball Association seasons
League
CBA